Events from the year 1748 in Sweden

Incumbents
 Monarch – Frederick I

Events

 - The King is no longer able to participate in politics because of health reasons, and a stamp with his signature is manufactured and used by the government of the Riksdag of the Estates. 
 - The Royal Order of the Seraphim, Order of the Sword and Order of the Polar Star is created. 
 - A new law disbands the privileges of all factories who cannot support themselves with the exception of private home manufacture.   
 - The Romani are formally allowed to live in Sweden. The condition is however that they settle permanently and abandon their nomadic life style.  
 - Eva Ekeblad is inducted to the Royal Swedish Academy of Sciences. She is the first female member there.
 - A fund and a home is established for the support of widows and orphans of sailors.

Births

 
 27 February - Anders Sparrman, naturalist, abolitionist and an apostle of Carl Linnaeus  (died 1820)
 5 March - Jonas Dryander, botanist  (died 1810)
 
 - Louis Masreliez, painter and interior designer   (died 1810)
 - Hedvig Wigert, opera singer  (died 1780)
 - Charlotte Manderström, courtier  (died 1816)

Deaths

References

 
Years of the 18th century in Sweden